Omar M'Dahoma (born 10 September 1987) is a Comorian international footballer who plays for French club FC Istres, as a defender.

Career
Born in Dzaoudzi, Mayotte, M'Dahoma has played for Marseille B, Endoume Catalans, Aurillac, Toulon Var and Aubagne.

He made his international debut for Comoros in 2015.

References

External links

1987 births
Living people
Citizens of Comoros through descent
Comorian footballers
Comoros international footballers
French footballers
French sportspeople of Comorian descent
FC Aurillac Arpajon Cantal Auvergne players
US Marseille Endoume players
SC Toulon players
Athlético Marseille players
FC Istres players
Championnat National 2 players
Championnat National 3 players
Association football defenders
Aubagne FC players
Mayotte footballers